Arhopala admete is a butterfly in the family Lycaenidae. It was described by William Chapman Hewitson in 1863. It is found in the Australasian realm, where it has been recorded from Serang, Obi, Bachan and Halmahera.

References

External links
Arhopala Boisduval, 1832 at Markku Savela's Lepidoptera and Some Other Life Forms. Retrieved June 3, 2017.

Arhopala
Butterflies described in 1863
Butterflies of Indonesia
Taxa named by William Chapman Hewitson